Linzi Hateley (born 23 October 1970) is an English stage actress. At the age of 21, in 1992, she became one of the youngest nominees for a Laurence Olivier Award for Best Actress in a Musical for her performance as the Narrator in the West End revival of Joseph and the Amazing Technicolor Dreamcoat.

Early life and acting background
Hateley was born in Birmingham. As a child Hateley attended Italia Conti Academy. She appeared as one of the orphans in the stage musical Annie and on television in several episodes of the BBC children's series Grange Hill.

Acting career
Hateley's first starring role was as the title character in the ill-fated Carrie - The Musical in both its Stratford-Upon-Avon and Broadway runs. In London, Hateley has starred in the original London revival production of Joseph and the Amazing Technicolor Dreamcoat as The Narrator (for which 21-year-old Linzi was nominated for a Laurence Olivier Award for Best Actress in a Leading Role in a Musical, becoming one of the youngest nominees for the award), Nancy in Oliver!, Éponine and Madame Thenardier in Les Misérables, Roxie Hart in Chicago, Martha in the original production of The Secret Garden, and Winifred Banks in the original production of Mary Poppins. She also played Donna in Mamma Mia! in the Prince of Wales Theatre, from 2007–2009 and 2010. She reprised this role from on 13 June 2016 in the Novello Theatre.

Hateley has released three solo albums: For The First Time (1992), Sooner or Later (1994), and True Colours (2001).

In 2008 Hateley recorded a song for the CD Act One - Songs From The Musicals Of Alexander S. Bermange, an album of 20 brand new recordings by 26 West End stars, released in November 2008 on Dress Circle Records. In 2012, Hateley appeared in the revival of the National Theatre's production of London Road, as the character Helen. Hateley also had a small role in the Les Misérables film as one of the women in "Turning".
In 2021 Hateley returned to her role as the Narrator in Joseph and the Amazing Technicolor Dreamcoat at the London Palladium followed by a UK tour of the show in 2022.

See also
List of British actors

References

External links
 Website for Carrie (musical), carriethemusical.weebly.com
 Biography unofficiallinzihateley.homestead.com
 Profile, musicaltheatrenews.com

1970 births
English women singers
English musical theatre actresses
Living people
Actresses from Birmingham, West Midlands
Alumni of the Italia Conti Academy of Theatre Arts